KSWL-LD (channel 17) is a low-power television station in Lake Charles, Louisiana, United States, affiliated with CBS. It is owned by SagamoreHill Broadcasting alongside MyNetworkTV/MeTV/Telemundo affiliate KWWE-LD (channel 19). Both stations share studios on West Prien Lake Road in Lake Charles, while KSWL-LD's transmitter is located at the KTSR tower in Westlake.

History 
In 2011, the FCC awarded the construction permit for the station, with the call sign of K17KH-D. The current KSWL-LD calls were adopted on February 10, 2017. Five days later, the station went on the air as the Lake Charles area's CBS affiliate.

KSWL-LD is the area's first CBS affiliate since the shutdown of its original CBS affiliate, KTAG-TV (UHF channel 25), in August 1961. Between that time, KLFY-TV in Lafayette served as the default CBS affiliate via cable for Southwestern Louisiana, while Beaumont affiliate KFDM was carried by a few cable providers in some areas of the market. Between KSWL-LD's sign-on as part of CBS, sister station KWWE-LD's sign on as a MyNetworkTV affiliate, and Fox affiliate KVHP launching ABC programming on its DT2 subchannel, the year 2017 marks the first time that the Lake Charles area has received over-the-air service from every major television network, having previously relied on cable television to supply network affiliates from Lafayette and Beaumont for CBS, ABC, MyNetworkTV, and until 2009, The CW.

News operation
The station is unusual among CBS affiliates in that it carries no local news. However, it airs local weather inserts during CBS Mornings as well as a five-minute weathercast at the conclusion of CBS' prime time programming. KSWL also produces and airs two sports programs focused on Southwest Louisiana-area sports: Sound Off, which is a call-in show about secondary and postsecondary sports, and Poke Nation, covering sports at McNeese State University.

Subchannels
The station's digital signal is multiplexed:

References

External links

Low-power television stations in the United States
CBS network affiliates
Ion Mystery affiliates
Court TV affiliates
SagamoreHill Broadcasting
SWL-LD
Television channels and stations established in 2017
2017 establishments in Louisiana